Dorsal interossei may refer to:

 Dorsal interossei of the hand, musculi interossei dorsales manus
 Dorsal interossei of the foot, musculi interossei dorsales pedis